Haan Maine Bhi Pyaar Kiya is a 2002 Indian Hindi-language romantic drama film, directed by Dharmesh Darshan. The film stars Abhishek Bachchan, Karishma Kapoor and Akshay Kumar. It is an unofficial remake of the Malayalam film Chanchattam (1991). The music of the film was composed by the duo Nadeem-Shravan.

Plot

Shiv (Abhishek Bachchan) and Pooja (Karishma Kapoor) are both looking for a job. They happen to be interviewed the same day in the same company and both are equally qualified for the job. At the interview venue, when Pooja sees that it will be difficult for her to get the job, she fools Shiv and gets the job. But later on, when Shiv too gets a job in that company, he learns that Pooja fooled him. After a lot of pranks and fun they fall in love and happily marry, but sometimes they get into the pettiest arguments coming from the way they approach life. Shiv takes each day as it comes whilst Pooja's imagination sometimes gets the best of her. Pooja gives up her career for him and settles down as a housewife. They go on their honeymoon to Switzerland and there they meet Meghna, who happens to be Shiv's college friend. One day when Shiv returns from a conference, he finds that Meghna is stuck on the road since her car is damaged. So Shiv decides to give a lift to Meghna since they happen to be staying in the same hotel. On account of the weather getting worse, they are unable to return to the hotel on time, so they have to stay in a hotel midway. The indifference between Shiv and Pooja gets worse when Shiv ends up spending the night with Meghna. Pooja overhears them talking about how they should put their one-night stand behind them. Shocked and disturbed, she asks for a divorce straight away and leaves him. Pooja then moves to Mumbai where she gets a job as the secretary of Raj (Akshay Kumar) who is a film star. Raj has everything anyone could ask for: money, fame, but not love. She happily works as his secretary and Raj falls in love with Pooja and she also likes him. One day they go for a shooting in Naini Hills and Pooja finds that Shiv happens to be the manager of the hotel where they stay. Pooja tells Shiv that she still cannot forgive Shiv for what happened in the past. Raj asks Shiv to be the best man at his wedding. So Shiv decides that he will not interfere in Pooja's life anymore. But on the day of the wedding, Pooja realizes that she is still in love with Shiv and should have forgiven him. Raj overhears this and decides to reunite Pooja and Shiv. They remarry and soon have a baby girl.

Cast 
 Abhishek Bachchan as Shiv Kapoor
 Karishma Kapoor as Pooja Kashyap / Pooja Shiv Kapoor
 Akshay Kumar as Raj Malhotra
 Simone Singh as Meghna
 Himani Shivpuri as Maria
 Shakti Kapoor as Chinni
 Navneet Nishan as Neha
 Mohnish Bahl as Rohit Kashyap, Pooja's brother 
 Supriya Karnik as Neha Kashyap, Pooja's sister-in-law
 Upasana Singh as milk vendor
 Dolly Bindra
 Razak Khan as Dil-phenk Hyderabadi
 Kadar Khan as Babban
 Sophiya Haque as Dancer in Red Saaree in song "Zindagi ko bina pyaar koi kaise guzaare"

Soundtrack 
The soundtrack of the movie was composed by the duo of Nadeem-Shravan with lyrics by Sameer. According to the Indian trade website Box Office India, with around 18,00,000 units sold, this film's soundtrack album was the year's eleventh highest-selling.

References

External links 
 

2002 films
2000s Hindi-language films
Films scored by Nadeem–Shravan
Indian romantic drama films
2002 romantic drama films
Films scored by Surinder Sodhi
Films shot in Switzerland
Films directed by Dharmesh Darshan